Forsten is a surname. Notable people with the surname include:

Aino Forsten (1885-1937), Finnish politician and educator
Eltio Alegondas Forsten (1811-1843), Dutch naturalist
G. V. Forsten (1857-1910), Finnish historian and professor

See also
Boiga forsteni, a species of snake known as Forsten's cat snake
Dusky megapode, a species of bird also known as Forsten's scrubfowl
Forsten's tortoise, a species of tortoise
Scarus forsteni, a species of fish also known as Forsten's parrotfish
Sunset lorikeet, a species of parrot also known as Forsten's lorikeet